Russell G. Cleary (May 22, 1933 – May 1, 1997) was an American brewer who was known for building the G. Heileman Brewing Company from the  15th in the brewing industry up to 4th during his tenure as president and CEO of the company from 1971 to 1989.

Background
Russell G. Cleary was born in Chippewa Falls, Wisconsin; however, he was orphaned at a young age. Following his parents' deaths, he went to live with his aunt and grandmother in La Crosse, Wisconsin. While in La Crosse, Cleary attended Franklin Elementary School, and Logan Junior and Senior High Schools. While at Logan High School, Cleary was editor of the school's yearbook and a leader on the debate team. Following his high school graduation, Cleary attended the University of La Crosse three year pre-law program and was accepted to the University of Wisconsin Law School in 1954, graduating in 1957. Cleary had the intention of moving to Reedsburg, Wisconsin to begin a law practice, but he and his wife returned to La Crosse, and he began working in real estate law.

Roy Kumm became president of the G. Heileman Brewing Company in 1957 and Cleary began working occasionally with Kumm on labor negotiations and business acquisitions.

G. Heileman Brewing Company

Cleary joined Heileman full-time as legal counsel for the company in 1960. Only four years after working at Heileman, Cleary was promoted to vice president and General Counsel of the company. Instead of merely assisting with labor contracts and acquisitions, Cleary was in charge of the following:
 labor negotiations
 acquisitions
 integration of acquired firms
 labor relations
 supervision of legal matters
 divisional advertising
 company-owned real estate

In 1967 Cleary was named to the Board of Directors. Four years later Kumm resigned as president of the company due to health reasons, and he died only months later. Following Kumm's resignation and death, Cleary was made president of the G. Heileman Brewing Company. One of Cleary's first moves as president was to acquire several breweries as a part of Heileman's 1972 purchase of Associated Brewing. The purchase of the company resulted in Heileman being catapulted up to 8th in the industry. The jump from 15th to 8th resulted in Heileman's stock being traded on the New York Stock Exchange for the first time in May 1973. After the large jump in rank, Cleary went on a campaign to even further Heileman's standing in the brewing industry ranks.

Cleary thought Heileman was the only viable company to compete with Anheuser-Busch and Miller. He continued his campaign of acquiring failing breweries, making several significant deals throughout his tenure as president. In 1977, Heileman purchased the Rainier brands and plant in Seattle, Washington. There was a deal in 1979 to acquire the Carling brands and several plants (Frankenmuth, Michigan; Baltimore, Maryland; Belleville, Illinois; Phoenix, Arizona, among others, which Heileman quickly sold or liquidated). Several contracts in 1983 put Heileman under control of a plant in Perry, Georgia; San Antonio, Texas, where they also purchased the Lone Star brand; and the Blitz-Weinhard Brewery; and brands in Portland, Oregon. Cleary's last major brewery move came in 1986 when Heileman finished the construction on a Val Blatz Microbrewery in Milwaukee, Wisconsin to produce the Blatz brand, which they had purchased in 1969.

As a boss, Cleary was well liked by his employees and wholesalers, having gone to high school with many of them. He was also well respected by his employees due to his union relations, as the union in La Crosse had some of the highest wages in the area. Many of his colleagues at Heileman and within the industry had positive things to say about Cleary.

Awards
Due to his commitment to the company and the La Crosse community, over the years, Cleary received many awards. Among his awards from the La Crosse area and the numerous financial and business magazines were the following:

 1969 - Awarded one of the 100 Outstanding Men of America by the Junior Chamber of Commerce
 1979 - Awarded the #1 Citizen of the Year of the City of La Crosse by the Mayor and City Council
 1980 - Awarded the Executive of the Year Award by Corporate Report Magazine
 1986 - Awarded the Entrepreneur of the year Award by Arthur Young
 1987 - Awarded the CEO of the Year Beverage Industry Bronze Award by Financial World Magazine
 1993 - Inducted to the Boys and Girls Club Wall of Fame

Retirement
One of the stipulations with the Bond Corporation was that Cleary stayed on as head of the company. After an additional two years at the Bond-run brewing company, Cleary finally announced his retirement in 1989. Cleary only briefly came out of retirement after Alan Bond went bankrupt and was forced to sell Heileman to Hicks, Muse, Tate, and Furst in 1994. He remained with the company until it was sold to the Stroh Brewing Company in 1996.

Cleary died in May 1997 after complications from heart surgery.

Involvement
During his retirement, Cleary became involved in a number of new ventures, including opening a real estate company, called Cleary Management Inc., which he continued to run when he rejoined Heileman in 1994. However, he was involved in a number of other organizations throughout his career at Heileman, especially in the La Crosse area. His involvement included, but was not limited to:

Personal life
Russell Cleary met his future wife, Gail Kumm, daughter of Roy E. Kumm, when the pair were juniors in high school. They went on to marry in 1955, when Gail's father was a comptroller of the G. Heileman Brewing Company. The couple had two children together: Kristine, a lawyer; and Sandra, an accountant. Following Cleary's death in 1997, Gail, Kristine, and Sandra took over control at Cleary Management.

Cleary was also very involved in Oktoberfest U.S.A, and was the Festmaster for the 1990 Oktoberfest.

Notes

External links

1933 births
1997 deaths
People from Chippewa Falls, Wisconsin
People from La Crosse, Wisconsin
Logan High School (La Crosse, Wisconsin) alumni
University of Wisconsin–La Crosse alumni
University of Wisconsin Law School alumni
Businesspeople from Wisconsin
Wisconsin lawyers
20th-century American businesspeople
20th-century American lawyers